

The Northern Pioneers was an infantry regiment of the Non-Permanent Active Militia of the Canadian Militia (now the Canadian Army). In 1936, the regiment was Amalgamated with The Algonquin Regiment.

Lineage

The Northern Pioneers 

 Originated on 1 September 1903, in Parry Sound, Ontario, as the 23rd Regiment, The Northern Fusiliers.
 Redesignated on 1 January 1904, as the 23rd Regiment "The Northern Pioneers".
 Redesignated on 1 May 1920, as The Northern Pioneers.
 Amalgamated on 15 December 1936, with The Algonquin Regiment.

Lineage Chart

Perpetuations 

 122nd (Muskoka) Battalion, CEF
 162nd (Parry Sound) Battalion, CEF

Organization

23rd Regiment, The Northern Fusiliers (01 September, 1903) 

 Regimental Headquarters (Parry Sound, Ontario)
 No. 1 Company (Parry Sound, Ontario)
 No. 2 Company (Kearney, Ontario)
 No. 3 Company (Sundridge, Ontario; later moved on 1 May 1911 to Bracebridge, Ontario)
 No. 4 Company (Powassan, Ontario) (later redesignated on 2 May 1904 as No. 6 Company)
 No. 5 Company (Callendar, Ontario; later moved on 1 May 1908, to Utterson, Ontario)
 No. 6 Company (Loring, Ontario) (later redesignated on 2 May 1904 as No. 4 Company)
 No. 7 Company (North Bay, Ontario)
 No. 8 Company (North Bay, Ontario; later moved on 1 February 1906, to McKellar, Ontario)

The Northern Pioneers (15 February 1921) 

 1st Battalion (perpetuating the 162nd Battalion, CEF)
 2nd (Reserve) Battalion (perpetuating the 122nd Battalion, CEF)

Battle Honours 

 Arras, 1917
 Hill 70
 Ypres, 1917

Notable Members 

 Francis Pegahmagabow

References 

Former infantry regiments of Canada
Military units and formations of Ontario
Algonquin Regiment (Northern Pioneers)